The Colonel Timothy Jones House is a historic house at 231 Concord Road in Bedford, Massachusetts.  It was built about 1775 for a prominent local military officer and civic official, and is a well-preserved example of period architecture with Colonial Revival alterations.  It was also historically associated with Shady Hill Nursery, one of the largest nurseries in New England at the turn of the 20th century.  It was listed on the National Register of Historic Places in 2021.

See also
National Register of Historic Places listings in Middlesex County, Massachusetts

References

Houses completed in 1775
Houses on the National Register of Historic Places in Middlesex County, Massachusetts
Houses in Bedford, Massachusetts